The FR Yugoslavia, then Serbia and Montenegro, Chess Championship was organized by the FR Yugoslavia and then Serbia and Montenegro Chess Association.

The FR Yugoslavia Chess Championship succeeded the Yugoslav Chess Championship after Slovenia, Croatia, Bosnia and Herzegovina and Macedonia separated from SFR Yugoslavia and formed their own championships.  FR Yugoslavia was renamed into Serbia and Montenegro in 2003.  In 2006 Montenegro left the state union, and separate Serbian Chess Championship and Montenegrin Chess Championship were formed.

In 2003 and 2004 championships were not held.

Winners list (Men) 

 FR Yugoslavia

{| class="sortable wikitable"
! No. !! Year !! Champion
|-
| 47 || 1992 || Aleksa Striković
|-
| 48 || 1993 || Miroljub Lazić
|-
| 49 || 1994 || Milan Vukić
|-
| 50 || 1995 || Petar Popović
|-
| 51 || 1996 || Božidar Ivanović
|-
| 52 || 1997 || Dragoljub Velimirović
|-
| 53 || 1998 || Miroslav Marković
|-
| 54 || 1999 || Miroslav Tošić
|-
| 55 || 2000 || Zlatko Ilinčić
|-
| 56 || 2001 || Branko Damljanović, Aleksandar Kovačević  Dejan Pikula and Nikola Ostojić 
|-
| 57 || 2002 || Miloš Pavlović
|}

 Serbia and Montenegro

{| class="sortable wikitable"
! No. !! Year !! Champion
|-
| 1 || 2005 || Miloš Perunović
|-
| 2 || 2006 || Branko Damljanović
|}

Winners list (Women) 

 FR Yugoslavia

{| class="sortable wikitable"
! No. !! Year !! Champion
|-
| 45 || 1992 || Sanja Vuksanović
|-
| 46 || 1993 || Mirjana Marić
|-
| 47 || 1994 || Irina Chelushkina
|-
| 48 || 1995 || Nataša Bojković
|-
| 49 || 1996 || Nataša Bojković
|-
| 50 || 1997 || Nataša Bojković
|-
| 51 || 1998 || Nataša Bojković
|-
| 52 || 1999 || Irina Chelushkina
|-
| 53 || 2000 || Svetlana Prudnikova 
|-
| 54 || 2001 || Irina Chelushkina
|-
| 55 || 2002 || Svetlana Prudnikova
|}

 Serbia and Montenegro

{| class="sortable wikitable"
! No. !! Year !! Champion
|-
| 1 || 2005 || Irina Chelushkina
|-
| 2 || 2006 || Irina Chelushkina
|}

References
https://web.archive.org/web/20070806233356/http://sah.vrsac.com/Aktuelno/Koviljaca.asp
http://xoomer.alice.it/cserica/scacchi/storiascacchi/tornei/pagine/yugoslavia.htm

yurope.com 1998 Women's edition 
1999 Crosstable at chess.gr (52nd Women's)
2001 Crosstables at chess.gr (56th Men's and 54th Women's)
Results from TWIC: 2000, 2005, 2005

Chess national championships
Women's chess national championships
Chess in Serbia
Chess